Route 585, or Highway 585, may refer to:

Canada
  Alberta Highway 585
  New Brunswick Route 585
  Ontario Highway 585

Ireland
  R585 regional road

United Kingdom
  A585 road

United States
 
 
 
 
 
 
 
Territories
  Puerto Rico Highway 585